NGC 4448 is a barred spiral galaxy with a prominent inner ring structure in the constellation Coma Berenices.

The galaxy is a member of the Coma I Group.

References

External links
 
 

Barred spiral galaxies
Coma Berenices
4448
07591
40988
Coma I Group